Kamal Al Taweel or Kamal El-Tawil (11 October 1922 – 9 July 2003) was a distinguished Egyptian composer and music author.

Born as Kamal Zaki Al Taweel in 1922 in Cairo, Egypt, Kamal graduated from the school of applied arts, and worked after graduating in 1942 at the Ministry of Social Affairs; however he joined the evening classes at the Higher Institute of Arabic music. He moved between more than one job, including the Office staff, inspectors of the telephone service, and control of music and singing on the Egyptian radio, before moving to the Ministry of Education as an Inspector of Music, and in 1965 he was dedicated only to music writing.

Kamal had a distinctive relationship with the late singer Abdel Halim Hafez, especially after graduation with Faida Kamel and Ahmed Fouad Hassan of the Institute of Arabic music in 1951. Kamal entered the public service, he was elected as a member of the Council of the Parliament of Egypt. Egyptian famous actress Soad Hosni first marriage to Abdel –Halim Hafiz was at first rumoured, but music composure Kamal Al-Taweel was one of the people who confirmed it.

Kamal composed many songs for Nagat El-Sagheera such as “Live with me” 

He survived by his wife Paola Ezzat and two sons, Khaled and Ziyad, with the latter establishing a reputation as a composer.

Awards 
On his death, he received the Egyptian State Merit Award.

See also 
list of Egyptians
كمال الطويل

References

External links 
 Egypt State Information Service
 Obituary in Al Ahram

1922 births
2003 deaths
Egyptian composers
20th-century Egyptian male singers